Kudanthai N. Ramalingam (born 15 August 1944) was an Indian politician and former Member of Parliament elected from Tamil Nadu. He was elected to the Lok Sabha as an Indian National Congress candidate from Mayuram constituency in a 1977 election, and as an Indian National Congress (Indira) candidate in a 1980 election.

References 

1944 births
Living people
Lok Sabha members from Tamil Nadu
India MPs 1977–1979
India MPs 1980–1984
People from Mayiladuthurai district